Poropuntius solitus is a species of freshwater, ray-finned fish in the genus Poropuntius. It was first described by Maurice Kottelat in 2000. This species is found in tributaries to the Xe Kong River on the eastern half of the Bolaven Plateau in Laos. Its population is decreasing due to overfishing, and proposed efforts to dam the river and its tributaries further threaten the species. The Poropuntius solitus is currently considered an endangered species by the International Union for Conservation of Nature and Natural Resources.

References 

solitus
Taxa named by Maurice Kottelat
Fish described in 2000